Alexandre Arnaudy was a French actor, born Marius Guarino on July 17, 1881 in Marseille, where he died on November 1, 1969.

Filmography 

 1932  : A phone call from Georges Lacombe  : Cormainville
 1932  : The Last Shock of Jacques de Baroncelli  : Vachot
 1932  : Direct in the heart of Roger Lion and Arnaudy: César Cannebois
 1933  : The Sunset of the Bride of Roger Lion  : Édouard Exubert
 1934  : The Jean Prince of Jean de Marguenat  : Liétard
 1935  : The alarm bell of Christian-Jaque
 1935  : Cigalon of Marcel Pagnol: Cigalon
 1936  : Topaz by Marcel Pagnol  : Mr. Topaze
 1937  : The Daughters of the Rhone by Jean-Paul Paulin
 1937  : The Escadrille of luck of Max de Vaucorbeil  : Tardimont
 1939  : They were nine singles of Sacha Guitry  : Me Renard
 1946  : The Guardian of Jean de Marguenat  : Parish Priest
 1946  : Not a word to the queen mother of Maurice Cloche
 1951  : Banco de Prince of Michel Dulud  : The concierge
 1951  : Adhémar or the toy of the fatality of Fernandel  : The minister
 1951  : La Table-aux-gouged by Henri Verneuil  : Miloin
 1952  : Sergil girls of Jacques Daroy
 1953  : A girl in the sun of Maurice Cam  : Bouzigues
 1953  : Carnival of Henri Verneuil  : The priest

Theater 

 1909  : Lysistrata by Maurice Donnay
 1912  : The Double Madrigal of Jean Auzanet  ; Directed by: André Antoine
 1922  : Heart Trump of Felix Gandera
 1922  : The alarm bell of Maurice Hennequin and Romain Coolus
 1923  : Romance of Robert de Flers and Francis de Croisset
 1926  : The Rose of September by Jacques Deval

References 

1881 births
1969 deaths
French male film actors